Lewis L. Lanier is an immunologist who is an American Cancer Society Professor and the chair of the Department of Microbiology and Immunology at the University of California, San Francisco. Since 2010, he has been a member of the National Academy of Sciences. He specializes on studying NK cells.

References

Year of birth missing (living people)
Living people
American immunologists
Place of birth missing (living people)
University of California, San Francisco faculty
Members of the United States National Academy of Sciences